Staples is a city in northeastern Guadalupe County, Texas, United States. In an election held on May 10, 2008, its residents voted to incorporate the community as a city. A total of 125 votes were cast, with 87 (69.6%) in favor of incorporation and 38 (30.4%) against. The population is approximately 220 and it is part of the San Antonio Metropolitan Statistical Area.

The city held its first municipal election on November 4, 2008. Eddie Daffern, an organizer of the incorporation effort, was elected unopposed as Mayor. A total of seven candidates ran for the five Alderman positions. Those elected include Carol Wester, who received 70 votes, followed by Ronnie Clark with 67 votes, Bert "Bubba" Reinke and William A. York—both winning 52 votes, and Shaun Seale with 40.

As of the 2010 census, Staples had a population of 267, along with a barber shop, two beauty shops, and a cafe.

Geography
Staples is located in northeastern Guadalupe County, just west of the San Marcos River, which forms the border with Caldwell County. Texas State Highway 130 runs through the southern part of Staples, providing a new freeway route between Austin,  to the north, and San Antonio,  to the southwest.

Demographics

Education

Students living in Staples are zoned to schools in the San Marcos Consolidated Independent School District.

External links

 City of Staples official website
 History of Staples, Texas
 Geographic Names Information System

References

Cities in Texas
Cities in Guadalupe County, Texas
Greater San Antonio
Populated places established in 2008